The World Individual Debating and Public Speaking Championships (WIDPSC) is an annual English language debating and public speaking tournament for individual high school-level students representing different countries. It is the public speaking equivalent of the World Schools Debating Championships.

History

The tournament was founded in 1988 by Reading Blue Coat School, St. John's-Ravenscourt School, the Debating Association of New England Independent Schools, Taunton School, Queen Anne's School, and The English School, Nicosia. It was one of the first international competitions to individually rank high school-level students in debating and public speaking. The tournament was founded the same year as the World Schools Debating Championships to respond to the desire for an equivalent competition for public speaking at the international level. 

The first Worlds was hosted by Reading Blue Coat School in Reading, England and continued to be hosted in England until 1995. The late 1990s saw the tournament's hosts began to cycle through different countries, with Argentina hosting in 1998, Botswana hosting in 1999, and Cyprus hosting in 2000.

Format

Organization
The tournament usually takes five to six days, with two to three rounds of events daily. The opening day of the tournament involves opening ceremonies and a guest speaker. The last two days do not involve any regular competition, except for those advancing to the final rounds. These days are occupied by a full day excursion or activity, and a formal closing banquet that involves the grand finals and awards ceremony. The grand finals of the tournament are considered to be a display of the tournament's best competitors. Some notable past locations of the grand finals have included the Utah State Capitol, Seimas of Lithuania and Kirstenbosch National Botanical Garden. Competitors also partake in other activities and outings organized by the host school during the week. These often involve exploring the city of the tournament.

Competitors must compete in four out of five events: parliamentary debate, impromptu speaking, interpretive reading, and either persuasive speaking or after-dinner speaking. Students compete in two preliminary rounds for each event. This is followed by a round of finals with approximately the top 10% of competitors competing. This is followed by a Grand Final show round, with the top two or three speakers in each character (the top 4 for debating).

Adjudication and Ranking

Adjudication for the tournament consists of members of the general public invited as judges, as well as one coach judge per room. Prior to the tournament, the host school will publicize the tournament and individuals locally associated with public speaking and debating and the host school will volunteer to judge. These individuals then participate in one or more training workshops. Scores are reviewed by a committee of coaches and experienced officials to discern for bias. The rationale behind this selection method stems from the founders' intent to assess ability on the basis of speaking to the 'common man or woman', not a specialized individual. Each competitor is judged by 40 to 50 judges by the end of the competition.

The top seven to twelve competitors in each event advance to final rounds, and the top two (or four for debate) competitors in the finals advance to the grand finals. Categorical rankings are decided on performance in the grand finals and finals. The final rounds are judged by coaches whose students are not in the category they are adjudicating.  The overall ranking is based solely on the combined results of the preliminary rounds.

A notable difference between the WIDPSC and the World Schools Debating Championships – the parallel major international competition which specializes in debating rather than public speaking – is that WSDC's primary focus is on the ranking of each country's team as opposed to each individual participant's ranking. Accordingly, students at the WIDPSC often compete against fellow members of their country's team.

Participants

Students from numerous countries have participated in the tournament, including: Australia, Hong Kong, Canada, the United States, England, South Africa, Lithuania, Pakistan, Cyprus, Argentina, Botswana, Israel, India, South Korea, Zimbabwe and Germany. Additionally, foreign nationals enrolled at schools abroad often compete, but are not officially recognized as representing an additional country. Usually participants are in their last two years of high school.

Competitors can qualify in several ways. These are: through direct application to their national debating and/or public speaking organization, through a national tournament, or if they belong to one of the founding schools, by their decision. Countries that have a more established debating and public speaking program often use qualifying competitions, which are extremely competitive. This is the method currently used by South Korea, Canada, the United States, Australia, Hong Kong, and South Africa. Alternatively, those with nascent or smaller programs rely on a handful of schools to select and send members; this includes Cyprus, Germany, and Pakistan.

Additionally, half of the team from the United States and Canada qualify through the International Independent Schools Public Speaking Championships. This competition is restricted to independent schools, and is of a similar format but of lesser significance and does not have competitor qualification requirements.

Governance

The championships is managed by The Independent Public Speaking Association, or IPSA. The IPSA is composed of schools and leagues that participate in the tournament on a regular basis. The organization's predominant responsibility is to oversee the tournament, and decisions about Worlds are made by general consensus at an annual general meeting. IPSA is not involved in the particulars of each tournament, and aside from a basic rubric, host schools have considerable freedom in the tournament's execution.

IPSA also contains an Executive Council composed of the founding schools and schools that have attended three out of five years and hosted the competition. The Executive Council  acts in an advisory capacity to host schools and when IPSA is unable to convene. It is responsible for the tournament's long-term sustainability.

Past Championships

Past Individual Event Winners

Footnotes

External links
 Worlds 2014, Hong Kong
 Worlds 2010, Lithuanian Debating Society, Lithuania
 Worlds 2009, Reading Blue Coats School, England
 Worlds 2008, Max-Born-Gymnasium  and Lessing-Gymnasium, Germany
 Worlds 2007, Diocesan College (Bishops), South Africa
  World Individual Debating and Public Speaking Championships Information Page

Schools debating competitions